Oliver Wray Neighbour, FBA (1 April 1923 – 20 January 2015) was a British musicologist and librarian. Along with Thurston Dart, Nigel Fortune and Stanley Sadie he was one of Britain's leading musicologists of the post-World War II generation.

References

1923 births
2015 deaths
British musicologists
British librarians